George William Guess (1822 – 18 July 1868) was mayor of Dallas, Texas (1866–1868).

Biography
George W. Guess was born in North Carolina in 1822.  He arrived in Texas about 1853 to practice law. He married Mary (Molly) Brown Miller, daughter of William Brown Miller and Minerva Barnes December 4, 1856. The couple had one child, George W. Guess, Jr. who died as an infant. Mary Miller Guess died in 1861.

On March 12, 1862, Guess enlisted in Dallas as a private in Capt. William W. Peak's Company, Hawpe's Regiment Texas Cavalry providing his own horse. This company became Co. A 31st Regiment of the Texas Volunteer Cavalry. On May 14, 1862, he was commissioned a Lt. Col. He was accused by the Confederates of speculating in cotton in 1862. He was captured by Maj. Gen. Dana's forces near Morganza, Louisiana September 29, 1863 and was imprisoned in New Orleans. In December 1864 he was transferred to Ship Island, Mississippi, a Union prison for Confederate soldiers.

George Guess was elected mayor in 1866 after John W. Lane resigned and served until Benjamin Long was appointed by federal military government. He was a member of the Tannehill Lodge No. 52, A. F. and A. M. and served as Worshipful Master in 1860, 1861, 1862 and 1867.

G. W. Guess died on the steamer "Victor" from sunstroke in the Mississippi River near Memphis, Tennessee on July 18, 1868. Guess had traveled to Memphis to bring back the body of his wife's brother-in-law, Frank Roberson, but instead was interred beside him at Elmwood Cemetery.

References

1822 births
1868 deaths
Mayors of Dallas
Confederate States Army officers
Date of birth missing
American Civil War prisoners of war
Deaths from hyperthermia
People from North Carolina
Texas lawyers
19th-century American politicians
19th-century American lawyers
Military personnel from Texas